Ainsworth, Washington, was a Franklin County, Washington town located on the northern bank of the mouth of the Snake River, in what is now Pasco, Washington.

Ainsworth was built as a depot on the Northern Pacific Railroad, and named after John C. Ainsworth, president of the Oregon Steam Navigation Company.  The town was platted in 1879. Thomas Symons, the US Army engineer at the site commented at the time,

When Franklin County was created from Whitman County in 1883, Ainsworth served as the county seat.  At the time, a number of Chinese laborers also lived in Ainsworth - many of whom worked for the railroad and operated local businesses.

In 1884, a railroad bridge across the Snake River was completed. By 1885, many of the buildings in Ainsworth were either dismantled or moved to Pasco.  The Chinese laborers also moved to the new town, and established their own district, but most of them left when the railroad work was completed and the work let up.  In 1885, the State Legislature officially moved the county seat to Pasco.

Over the years, Pasco increased in size and engulfed the original townsite.

Notes and references

Ghost towns in Washington (state)